Comboios is an Indigenous Land of the tupiniquim people in the Brazilian state of  Espírito Santo. In 1997 the first assembly of the tupinikim and guarani peoples was held here. Comboios was the only village in the area not participating in the protests against the Aracruz corporation, which is active in deforestation of
rain forests.  Comboios is within the Aracruz municipality.

Populated places in Espírito Santo